Tom Storm (born 16 March 1965 in Borlänge, Sweden) is a former Swedish professional pool player. Storm was the runner-up at the 1996 WPA World Nine-ball Championship. Storm represented Europe at the Mosconi Cup twice, in 1994 and 1995.

Storm has won a total of 5 Euro Tour events, placing him 7th in the highest winners on tour. He won his first Euro Tour event in 1994, at the Danish Open.

Titles
 1987 European Pool Championship 9-Ball
 1988 European Pool Championship 9-Ball
 1990 European Pool Championship 8-Ball
 1994 Euro Tour Danish Open
 1995 Euro Tour French Open
 1995 Mosconi Cup 
 1996 Euro Tour German Open
 1999 European Pool Championship 14.1
 2003 Euro Tour Belgian Open
 2003 Euro Tour German Open

References

External links

Living people
1965 births
Swedish pool players
People from Borlänge Municipality
Competitors at the 2005 World Games
Sportspeople from Dalarna County